Kalle Eerola (born 1 November 1983) is a Finnish former professional footballer who played as a left-back.

Career
He won the Finnish Cup with FC Haka in 2005. He retired from football in 2013 as part of the Ilves reserve team.

References

External links
Kalle Eerola at Guardian

1983 births
Living people
Sportspeople from Lahti
Finnish footballers
FC Haka players
FC Lahti players
Veikkausliiga players
Association football defenders